This is a non-comprehensive list of Iranian philosophers.

Pre-modern

A
 Abū Rayḥān al-Bīrūnī
 Al Amiri
 Allameh Tabatabaei
 Avicenna
 Abdol Hossein Khosrow Panah

D
 Gholamhossein Ebrahimi Dinani

F
 Ahmad Fardid
 Farabi

G
 al-Ghazali

H
 Ayn-al-Qudat Hamadani
 Hossein Nasr

J
 Jamasp
 Jamasp

K
 Omar Khayyám

M
 Abu Tahir Marwazi
 Mir Damad
 Ibn Miskawayh
 Mir Fendereski
 Mir Damad
 Mulla Hadi Sabzevari
 Mazdak
 Mu'ayyad fi'l-Din al-Shirazi

N
 Nasir Khusraw

O
 Ostanes

P
 Shirzad Peik Herfeh

Q
 Qutb al-Din al-Shirazi

R
 Fakhr al-Din al-Razi

S
 Mulla Sadra
 Mu'ayyad fi'l-Din al-Shirazi
 Abu Yaqub Sijistani
 Shahab al-Din Suhrawardi
 Shaykh Tusi

T
 Nasir al-Din Tusi
 Manouchehr Taslimi

Z
 al-Zamakhshari
 Zoroaster

Contemporary
 Bijan Abdolkarimi
 Morehshin Allahyari
 Reza Davari Ardakani
 Ahmad Mahdavi Damghani
 Nur Ali Elahi
 Hossein Elahi Ghomshei
 Mirza Hashem Eshkevari
 Mohammad Ilkhani
Gholamreza Aavani
 Ramin Jahanbegloo
 Manuchehr Jamali
 Mahmoud Khatami
 Ali Latifiyan
 Nadia Maftouni
 Brian Massumi
 Seyyed Hossein Nasr
Insha-Allah Rahmati
 Reza Negarestani
 Daryush Shokof
 Abdolkarim Soroush
 Allameh Tabatabaei
 Hamid Vahid

Philosophers
Iranian